Szymon Matuszek (born 7 January 1989) is a Polish professional footballer who plays as a midfielder for Miedź Legnica.

Career

Club
In February 2011, he was loaned to Chojniczanka Chojnice on a half year deal. He returned half a year later.

On 4 August 2020, he moved to Miedź Legnica.

Honours
Miedź Legnica
I liga: 2021–22

References

External links 
 
 

1989 births
People from Cieszyn
Sportspeople from Silesian Voivodeship
Living people
Polish footballers
Polish expatriate footballers
Association football midfielders
Poland under-21 international footballers
Jagiellonia Białystok players
Piast Gliwice players
Chojniczanka Chojnice players
Wisła Płock players
Ząbkovia Ząbki players
Górnik Zabrze players
Miedź Legnica players
Ekstraklasa players
I liga players
III liga players
Expatriate footballers in Spain
Polish expatriate sportspeople in Spain